Neosho Township may refer to the following townships in the United States:

 Neosho Township, Cherokee County, Kansas
 Neosho Township, Coffey County, Kansas
 Neosho Township, Newton County, Missouri